The Jubilee line is a London Underground line that runs between  in east London and  in the suburban north-west, via the Docklands, South Bank and West End. Opened in 1979, it is the newest line on the Underground network, although some sections of track date back to 1932 and some stations to 1879.

The later stations are larger and have special safety features, both aspects being attempts to future-proof the line. Following the extension to east London, serving areas once poorly connected to the Underground, the line has seen a huge growth in passenger numbers and is the third-busiest on the network (after the Northern and Central lines), with over 213 million passenger journeys in 2011/12.

Between  and  the Jubilee line shares its route with the Metropolitan line and Chiltern Main Line. Between  and Stratford it runs parallel to the  branch of the Docklands Light Railway. The Jubilee line is printed silver on the Tube map, to commemorate  the Silver Jubilee of Elizabeth II, after which the line was named.

History

1932 to 1939 
The first section of what is now the Jubilee line opened in 1932, when the Metropolitan Railway built a branch from its main line at Wembley Park to Stanmore. The line, as with many others in the northwest London area, was designed for the use of commuters from the new and rapidly expanding suburbs. The line presented the Metropolitan with a problem. The suburban traffic had been so successful that, by the early 1930s, the lines into Baker Street were becoming overloaded, a problem exacerbated by the post-war flight from the City of London to the West End of London.

At first, the Metropolitan had advocated a new deep tube line roughly following the line of the Edgware Road between the tube station and a point near Willesden Green. Indeed, construction advanced as far as the rebuilding of Edgware Road station to accommodate 4 platforms of 8-car length. Things changed, though, with the formation of the London Passenger Transport Board (LPTB) and the subsequent absorption of the Metropolitan line. The solution was now a new branch of the Bakerloo line from Baker Street to serve new stations at St John's Wood and Swiss Cottage, thereby rendering the existing stations of Lord's, Marlborough Road and Swiss Cottage on the parallel route redundant, and negating the need for the Met's extension from Edgware Road station. It was originally proposed that the Metropolitan line's Swiss Cottage station would remain open during peak hours for interchange with the Bakerloo, and that Lord's station would open for special cricketing events, but both were closed permanently as economy measures during the Second World War. The new line rose between the Metropolitan line tracks at Finchley Road, providing cross-platform interchange with the Metropolitan line. Continuing north to Wembley Park, the new Bakerloo line branch was to provide local service on the Metropolitan line, while Metropolitan line trains ran non-stop between Finchley Road and Wembley Park, cutting seven minutes from journey times. At Wembley Park, the new Bakerloo would turn north to serve Kingsbury, Queensbury, Canons Park and Stanmore, taking over the former Metropolitan branch. The Bakerloo extension, built as above, opened in 1939.

1939 to 1979, the Fleet line 

The planning for the Tube network immediately before and after World War II considered several new routes. The main results of this study concerned two major routes: the south-to-northeast "line C", and lines 3 and 4, new cross-town routes, linking the northwest suburbs to Fenchurch Street, Wapping and variously Lewisham and Hayes. Line C opened as the Victoria line, in stages, from 1968 to 1972. Work on the northwest–southeast route continued.

The "Fleet line" was mentioned in a 1965 Times article, discussing options after the Victoria line had been completed – suggesting that the Fleet line could take a route via Baker Street, Bond Street, Trafalgar Square, Strand, Fleet Street, Ludgate Circus and Cannon Street, then proceeding into southeast London. The new line was to have been called the Fleet line, after the River Fleet (although it would only have crossed under the Fleet at Ludgate Circus; the central London section mostly follows the Tyburn).

In 1971, construction began on the new Fleet line. Economic pressure and doubt over the final destination of the line had led to a staged approach. Under the first stage, the Baker Street-to-Stanmore branch of the Bakerloo line was joined at Baker Street to a new  segment into central London, with intermediate stops at Bond Street and Green Park and terminating at a new station at Charing Cross, thereby relieving pressure on the West End section of the Bakerloo line between Baker Street and Charing Cross and also allowing increased frequencies on the section north of Baker Street. The new tube was to offer cross-platform interchange between the Bakerloo and Fleet at Baker Street, as pioneered on the Victoria line. The work was completed in 1979. As part of the works, Trafalgar Square (Bakerloo) and Strand (Northern) stations were combined into a single station complex, Charing Cross. The existing Charing Cross station on the sub-surface District and Circle lines was renamed Embankment.

Another part of the works included a section of test tunnel, built near New Cross. This part of London has waterlogged soil that is difficult to tunnel in, so a new tunnelling method, called the bentonite shield, was used experimentally to construct a 150 m section of tunnel, that was on the line of the proposed Phase 2 route, in 1972. The experiment was successful, leading to the introduction of this form of construction elsewhere, but when the planned route was altered, this  section was left abandoned.

In 1975, when plans were under way to introduce the London Transport Silver Jubilee Bus fleet, the then Sales Manager of London Transport Advertising, Geoffrey Holliman, proposed to the Chairman of LTE, Kenneth Robinson, that the Fleet line should be renamed the Jubilee line. However, this idea was initially rejected because of the additional costs involved. Nevertheless, the name was ultimately chosen for the line after Queen Elizabeth II's 1977 Silver Jubilee following a pledge made by the Conservatives in the Greater London Council election of 1977. The original choice of battleship grey for the line's colour was based on the naval meaning of the word fleet; this became a lighter grey, representing the silver colour of the Jubilee itself.

The line was officially opened by the Prince of Wales on 30 April 1979, with passenger services operating from 1 May 1979.

Proposed extensions 
The Jubilee line of 1979 was to be the first of four phases of the project, but lack of funds meant that no further progress was made until the late 1990s.

 Phase 2 would have extended the line along Fleet Street to stations at Aldwych, Ludgate Circus, Cannon Street and Fenchurch Street. Parliamentary approval for this phase was granted on 27 July 1971.
Parliamentary approval for this phase as far as New Cross was granted on 5 August 1971 and the final section to Lewisham was granted approval on 9 August 1972.
 In 1973, an alternative plan for Phase 3 was devised to provide transport connections to the London Docklands area then being considered for regeneration as it was expected that the docks would be closed by the late 1980s. Initially proposed as a mainline service but later developed as a tube line extension for the Jubilee line, the new plan was developed over the next few years to a final form that considered extending the line parallel to the River Thames known informally as the 'River line'. This was to take the line from Fenchurch Street to Thamesmead via St Katharine Docks, Wapping, Surrey Docks North, Millwall (near the later location of South Quay DLR station), North Greenwich, Custom House, Silvertown, Woolwich Arsenal, and then to Thamesmead Central. The depot would have been at Beckton, roughly on the site of the current Docklands Light Railway depot, and a shuttle service between there and Customs House was considered. Parliamentary approval for the route as far as Woolwich Arsenal including the Beckton branch was granted on 1 August 1980.
 Phase 4 was the possible continuation of the original Phase 3 Lewisham branch to take over suburban services on the Addiscombe and Hayes branches.

Millennium extension 

Changes in land use, particularly the urban renewal of the Docklands area, resulted in the project to extend the line beyond Charing Cross being changed considerably in the 1970s, 1980s and 1990s. The Jubilee Line Extension, as the eventual project became known, opened in three stages in 1999. It split from the existing line at Green Park; the service to Charing Cross was discontinued (though still maintained for reversing trains at times of disruption, and for occasional use as a film set). The line extends as far as Stratford, with ten intermediate stations. This section is unique on the Underground because it is the only section to have platform edge doors which open automatically when trains arrive.

There have been other proposals to extend the line serving the docks.

24-hour weekend service 
It was planned that from Saturday 12 September 2015, there would be a 24-hour service on Friday and Saturday nights on the entire Jubilee line as part of the new Night Tube service pattern. This was postponed due to an ongoing dispute between Transport for London and rail unions. In August 2016, Sadiq Khan, Mayor of London, announced that the Jubilee line night tube would run with services starting on 7 October 2016.

Current Jubilee line
Open since 1979, the Jubilee line is the newest line of the London Underground network. The trains were upgraded in 1997 to the 1996 stock. In 1999, trains began running to Stratford instead of Charing Cross, serving areas once poorly connected to the London Underground network.

Station features 
Jubilee line stations north of Baker Street were not built specifically for the Jubilee line. St John's Wood and Swiss Cottage stations were opened in 1939 on the then-new Bakerloo line branch and have more traditional tube station features. Stations north of Finchley Road were opened by the Metropolitan Railway (now the Metropolitan line), but they became part of the Bakerloo in 1939, with only Wembley Park being shared with the Metropolitan. Then, the Jubilee line took over the whole of the Bakerloo line service between Baker Street and Stanmore. The only stations with new platforms built for the original Jubilee line were the Baker Street westbound platform (eastbound opened in 1939), Bond Street, Green Park and the now-closed Charing Cross.

Stations on the Jubilee Line Extension feature:
step-free access to street level
contemporary architecture, with stations each being designed by a different architect (e.g. Canary Wharf by Foster and Partners, North Greenwich by Alsop, Lyall and Störmer)
substantially more escalators than previous stations (increasing the number of escalators on the Underground by half)
modern fire safety standards including evacuation routes and ventilation shafts
platform edge doors

The platform edge doors were introduced primarily to prevent draughts underground and to assist in air flow. They also prevent people from falling or jumping onto the track, as well as the build-up of litter.

Rolling stock 

When the Jubilee line was opened, it was operated by 1972 stock. In 1984, this was partially replaced by the new 1983 stock: the displaced 1972 stock was transferred to the Bakerloo line. The 1983 stock proved to be unreliable and troublesome in service, with single-leaf doors making passenger loading and unloading a slower process than on other stock with wider door openings. With the construction of the Jubilee line Extension, the opportunity was taken to introduce new trains, and today the line is worked by 1996 stock, which has an exterior similar to the 1995 stock in use on the Northern line but (in spite of the confusing naming) is technically less advanced. The new stock has internal displays and automated announcements to provide passengers with information on the train's route. At first, the displayed text was static and showed only the destination of the train, but later showed also the name of the next station and interchanges there. Subsequent modifications introduced scrolling text. The 1996 stock uses a different motor from the 1995 stock and has a motor design similar to Class 465 and Class 466 Networker trains.

Seventh car upgrade 
The Jubilee line closed for three days from 25 December 2005 in order to add an extra car to each six-car train. The line had to be closed as six- and seven-car trains could not run in service at the same time, because the platform-edge doors at Jubilee Line Extension stations could not cater for both train lengths simultaneously. The signalling system was also modified to work with the longer trains.

Previously, an extra four complete seven-car trains had been added to the fleet, bringing the total to 63. This enabled the period during which a full service could be run to be increased. The full fleet was not required to be available until full advantage has been taken of the new signalling system.

The result of the seventh car upgrade was a 17% increase in capacity, allowing 6,000 more passengers per hour to use the line. Work was completed and the line reopened two days ahead of schedule, on 28 December 2005.

Signalling system 
Since 2011, the Jubilee line has automatic train operation (ATO), using the SelTrac S40 moving block system. This provides capacity for 30 trains per hour.

Migration to the system was problematic. The programme of temporary closures for engineering work was criticised by local politicians as well as by the management of venues such as Wembley Stadium and The O2 because visitors to major concerts and sporting events had to travel by rail replacement bus. The management of the project by Tube Lines was criticised by London TravelWatch for its delayed delivery date, and a report by the London Assembly referred to the weekly line closures as "chaotic".

4G connectivity 
In March 2020, a leaky feeder based system was brought online in the Jubilee line tunnels, between Westminster and Canning Town. The development of this system arose from the Home Office's desire to provide coverage for its new Emergency Services Network on the London Underground. It allows passengers to receive 4G connectivity both in the tunnels and on station platforms.

This is the only section of London Underground tunnel that has wireless connectivity. TfL intends to deploy the technology across the entire Tube network by the mid-2020s.

Future

Thamesmead branch 
When North Greenwich Underground station was opened, it was built to enable a branch extension to be built eastwards to Thamesmead. There are currently no plans to construct this branch route.

West Hampstead interchange 
Plans were put forward in 1974 and again in 2004 for a West Hampstead interchange, to connect the three West Hampstead stations in one complex, but plans were put on hold in 2007 owing to uncertainty over the North London Line rail franchise.
While no connections in the form of railway infrastructure exist, the three stations at West Hampstead form part of an "out of station" interchange in the Oyster system thus continuing similar (but little-publicised) interchange arrangements in existence since before nationalisation.

Map

Services 
Jubilee line services are:

Peak services at 30 tph in the core section between Stratford and West Hampstead:
 18 tph Stratford – Stanmore
 4 tph Stratford – West Hampstead
 4 tph Stratford – Willesden Green
 4 tph Stratford – Wembley Park
 Some peak services originate or terminate at West Ham or Neasden

Off-Peak services at 24 tph in the core section between Stratford and West Hampstead:
 12 tph Stratford – Stanmore
 4 tph Stratford – Willesden Green
 4 tph Stratford – Wembley Park
 4 tph Stratford – West Hampstead

Stations

Former stations 
The Jubilee line platforms at Charing Cross are still used during service suspensions. For example, when the service is suspended between Green Park and Stratford, trains will terminate (and passengers alight) at Green Park before going to Charing Cross and using a scissors crossover to reverse back westbound. The platforms are a popular set for films and television because the platforms are contemporary and the trains used are current ones that appear in normal passenger service.

Depots 
The main servicing and maintenance depot on the Jubilee line is Stratford Market Depot  between the Stratford and West Ham stations. Trains are also stabled in Neasden Depot – sharing it with the Metropolitan line.

Stratford Market Depot was built as part of the Jubilee Line Extension in the late 1990s, as the Neasden Depot could not accommodate the increased number of trains required.

Maps 

Stanmore – 
Canons Park – 
Queensbury – 
Kingsbury – 
Wembley Park – 
Neasden – 
Dollis Hill – 
Willesden Green – 
Kilburn – 
West Hampstead – 
Finchley Road – 
Swiss Cottage – 
St John's Wood – 
Baker Street – 
Bond Street – 
Green Park – 
Westminster – 
Waterloo – 
Southwark – 
London Bridge – 
Bermondsey – 
Canada Water – 
Canary Wharf – 
North Greenwich – 
Canning Town – 
West Ham – 
Stratford – 
Neasden Depot – 
Stratford Market Depot –

See also 
Jubilee Line corruption trial
List of crossings of the River Thames
Tunnels underneath the River Thames

References

External links 

 

 
 
 
  (photo gallery)

London Underground lines
Railway lines opened in 1979
Transport in the London Borough of Brent
Transport in the London Borough of Camden
Transport in the Royal Borough of Greenwich
Transport in the London Borough of Harrow
Transport in the London Borough of Newham
Transport in the London Borough of Southwark
Transport in the London Borough of Tower Hamlets
Transport in the City of Westminster
Tunnels underneath the River Thames
Automatic London Underground lines
Standard gauge railways in London
Silver Jubilee of Elizabeth II